K. E. Allen is an American poet.

Life
K.E. Allen (Kelly Allen) received her B.A. in English from Seattle University and M.F.A. in Creative Writing from the University of Michigan.

Her work has appeared in Arts & Letters, Center, Kenyon Review, LIT, Lynx, Poetry Daily, Rivendell, Spinning Jenny, Sycamore Review, Verse.

She teaches at the University of Michigan. She lives in Chelsea, Michigan. She is married, with a daughter, Nora Medbh Gillard.

Awards
 Academy of American Poets Prize
 Hopwood Major Prize in Poetry
 Meijer Award
 2000 Dana Award
 2004 Poetry Society of America National Chapbook Fellowship

Works

References

Reviews

Keith Taylor, "Belief is Perception", Ann Arbor Observer, April 2005.

Year of birth missing (living people)
Living people
Poets from Michigan
University of Michigan faculty
People from Chelsea, Michigan
American women poets
American women academics
21st-century American women